Sunstroke is a 1953 Danish comedy film directed by Astrid Henning-Jensen and Bjarne Henning-Jensen.

Cast
 Kjeld Petersen as Portieren
 Birgitte Reimer as Frk. Vibeke Søgaard
 Preben Neergaard as Teddy / Theodor Winther
 Ole Monty as Overlæge Grå
 Helle Virkner as Mona Miller
 Lise Ringheim as Eva Linde
 Jessie Rindom as Frk. Suhr
 Dirch Passer as Politimanden

External links

1953 films
1950s Danish-language films
1953 comedy films
Danish black-and-white films
Films directed by Astrid Henning-Jensen
Films directed by Bjarne Henning-Jensen
Danish comedy films